Southern Cross is a locality in south west Victoria, Australia.

Coughlan's Southern Cross Hotel was built in 1875 but was stripped of its liquor licence in 1918. The building is now in private hands.

References

External links

Towns in Victoria (Australia)